Yohanna Ibrahim also Gregorios Yohanna Ibrahim (born August 18, 1948) is the Syriac Orthodox archbishop of Aleppo. He was kidnapped on April 22, 2013, along with Paul (Yazigi), the Greek Orthodox metropolitan of Aleppo.

Life 

Ibrahim was born on August 18, 1948 in Qamishly, Syria. He studied Ecclesiastical Studies and Canon Law at the Pontifical Oriental Institute (Roma Istituto Orientale) in Rome from 1973 to 1976. He became a monk in 1973, a deacon in 1976, a priest in 1976, and a bishop in 1979. In 1988 he established the Al Raha Mardin Publishing House in Aleppo. 

Ibrahim received degrees from St. Ephrem Theological Seminary in Zahle Lebanon, the Oriental Institute in Rome, and the Pontifical Oriental Institute in Rome. He received a PhD from Birmingham University in the UK. The title of his dissertation was “Christian Arabs in Mesopotamia before Islam.” Before he became a bishop in Syria, Ibrahim had positions in Iraq, Sweden, Holland, Belgium, and Lebanon. He was on the committees of many religious boards, including the Global Christian Forum, the Executive Committee of the Middle East Council of Churches, and the Central Committee of the World Council of Churches.

Kidnapping
Ibrahim disappeared in 2013 while traveling with Boulos Yazigi to negotiate the release of two kidnapped priests. It is believed the kidnappers were Chechen. In March 2019, a Lebanese newspaper reported that Syrian democrats were negotiating for his release from ISIS.

However, the Rewards for Justice Program offers $5 million for information on ISIS network responsible for kidnapping Christian clerics: Maher Mahfouz, Michael Kayyal, Yohanna Ibrahim, Boulos Yazigi, and Paolo Dall'Oglio.

See also
List of kidnappings

Works 
 "The Concept of Jurisdiction and Authority in the Syrian Orthodox Church on Antioch", tr. Monk Melki

References

Other websites 
 M.G.Y.Abraham @Morgregorios on Twitter
 Friends of Mor Gregorios Yohanna Ibrahim on Facebook
 Syrian Orthodox Archdiocese or Aleppo and Environs official website (Arabic language)

1948 births
2010s missing person cases
20th-century Oriental Orthodox bishops
21st-century Oriental Orthodox archbishops
Kidnappings in Syria
Living people
Missing people
Missing person cases in Syria
Syrian Oriental Orthodox Christians